Sculptotheca is a genus of beetles in the family Ptinidae. There are about ten described species in Sculptotheca, one of which is Sculptotheca puberula.

References

Further reading

 
 
 
 
 

Ptinidae